The IPSC Austrian National Handgun Championship is an IPSC level 3 championship held once a year by the Austrian Association for Practical Shooting.

Champions 
The following is a list of previous and current champions.

Overall Category

Lady Category

Junior Category

Senior Category

Super Senior Category

Team Category

References 
Hall of Fame - IPSC Austria
http://www.schuetzenbund.at/oesb/

IPSC shooting competitions
National shooting championships
Shooting competitions in Austria
Handgun